Neoniphargidae is a family of crustaceans belonging to the order Amphipoda.

Genera:
 Jasptorus Bradbury & Williams, 1997
 Neocrypta Bradbury & Williams, 1997
 Neoniphargus (type genus) Stebbing, 1899
 Tasniphargus Williams & Barnard, 1988
 Wesniphargus Williams & Barnard, 1988
 Wombeyanus Bradbury & Williams, 1997
 Yulia Williams & Barnard, 1988

References